Daniel Ernest Schatzeder (born December 1, 1954) is a former professional baseball player who pitched in the major leagues from – for nine different teams. Schatzeder attended Willowbrook High School in Villa Park, Illinois then played college baseball at the University of Denver. After he retired from the majors, he was a physical fitness teacher at Waubonsie Valley High School in Aurora, Illinois, until he retired after the 2014-2015 school year.

He was traded from the Montreal Expos to the Detroit Tigers for Ron LeFlore on December 7, 1979. This followed a season in which his 2.83 earned run average (ERA) was the lowest among National League left‐handed pitchers who qualified for the statistical title.

Schatzeder was a good hitting pitcher in his major league career. He posted a .240 batting average (58-for-242) with 5 home runs, 29 RBI, 18 bases on balls and a .351 slugging percentage.

Career highlights
 In 1986, Schatzeder had 5 pinch hits for the Montreal Expos, the most by a pitcher since Don Newcombe in 1959.
 Schatzeder was the winning pitcher for the Minnesota Twins in Game 6 of the 1987 World Series.
 Schatzeder was the only pitcher to surrender more than one home run to Ozzie Smith, who hit just 28 over his career.

References

External links

1954 births
Living people
American people of German descent
American expatriate baseball players in Canada
Baseball players from Illinois
Cleveland Indians players
Denver Bears players
Denver Pioneers baseball players
Detroit Tigers players
Houston Astros players
Indianapolis Indians players
Kansas City Royals players
Major League Baseball pitchers
Minnesota Twins players
Montreal Expos players
New York Mets players
People from Elmhurst, Illinois
Philadelphia Phillies players
Phoenix Giants players
Portland Beavers players
Quebec Metros players
San Francisco Giants players
Tidewater Tides players
Tucson Toros players
West Palm Beach Expos players
Peninsula Oilers players